The Roman Catholic Diocese of Coimbatore is a diocese located in the city of Coimbatore in the Ecclesiastical province of Madras and Mylapore in India.

History
 1845: Established as Apostolic Pro-Vicariate of Coimbatore from the Apostolic Vicariate of Madura and Coromandel Coast and Diocese of Madura
 1850: Promoted as Apostolic Vicariate of Coimbatore
 September 1, 1886: Promoted as Diocese of Coimbatore

Leadership

 Vicars Apostolic of Coimbatore (Latin Rite)
 Melchior-Marie-Joseph de Marion-Brésillac, M.E.P. † (16 Mar 1845 Appointed - 18 Mar 1855 Resigned) 
 Claude-Marie Dépommier, M.E.P. † (17 Feb 1865 Appointed - 8 Dec 1873 Died) 
 Bishops of Coimbatore (Latin Rite)
 Etienne-Auguste-Joseph-Louis Bardou, M.E.P. † (30 Apr 1874 Appointed - 7 Feb 1903 Died) 
 Jacques-Denis Peyramale, M.E.P. † (23 May 1903 Appointed - 17 Aug 1903 Died) 
 Augustine-Antoine Roy, M.E.P. † (12 Feb 1904 Appointed - 4 Dec 1930 Retired) 
 Marie-Louis-Joseph-Constantin Tournier, M.E.P. † (12 Jan 1932 Appointed - Jan 1938 Resigned) 
 Ubagarasamy Bernadeth † (9 Apr 1940 Appointed - 5 Feb 1949 Died) 
 Francis Xavier Muthappa † (25 Dec 1949 Appointed - 23 Nov 1971 Died) 
 Manuel Visuvasam † (3 Feb 1972 Appointed - 2 Jun 1979 Died) 
 Ambrose Mathalaimuthu † (6 Dec 1979 Appointed - 10 Jul 2002 Retired) 
 Thomas Aquinas Lephonse (10 Jul 2002 Appointed - )

Causes for canonisation
 Ven. Melchior de Marion Brésillac

References

External links
 GCatholic.org 
 Catholic Hierarchy 
 Diocese website 
 Catholic Church Directory

Roman Catholic dioceses in India
Religious organizations established in 1850
Roman Catholic dioceses and prelatures established in the 19th century
1850 establishments in India
Christianity in Tamil Nadu